Chang Xinyue (born 13 February 1994) is a Chinese ski jumper. She is an absolute Chinese national record holder, with 125 metres (410 ft) set in Lillehammer, Norway.

World Cup

Standings

Individual starts (16)

External links 

1994 births
Living people
Chinese female ski jumpers
People from Tonghua
Skiers from Jilin
Ski jumpers at the 2018 Winter Olympics
Olympic ski jumpers of China